The mental model theory of reasoning was developed by Philip Johnson-Laird and Ruth M.J. Byrne (Johnson-Laird and Byrne, 1991). It has been applied to the main domains of deductive inference including relational inferences such as spatial and temporal deductions; propositional inferences, such as conditional, disjunctive and negation deductions; quantified inferences such as syllogisms; and meta-deductive inferences.

Ongoing research on mental models and reasoning has led the theory to be extended to account for probabilistic inference (e.g., Johnson-Laird, 2006) and counterfactual thinking (Byrne, 2005).

See also
 
 Psychology of reasoning

References
 Byrne, R.M.J. (2005). The Rational Imagination: How People Create Alternatives to Reality. Cambridge, M.A.: MIT Press.
 Johnson-Laird, P.N. (2006). How We Reason. New York: Oxford University Press. 
 Johnson-Laird, P.N., & Byrne, R.M.J. (1991). Deduction. Hillsdale, NJ:  Lawrence Erlbaum Associates.

Psychological models
Reasoning
Theories of deduction